Chatou–Croissy is a railway station in Chatou, France, on the A1 branch of the Paris Region RER commuter rail line A.

Railway stations in France opened in 1972
Railway stations in Yvelines
Réseau Express Régional stations